Simone Johnson or Simone Gooden (born 2 July 1970), better known by her stage name Monie Love, is a British rapper, actress, and radio personality known for her singles during the late 1980s through the 1990s. Love is a radio personality for urban adult contemporary station KISS 104.1 WALR-FM in Atlanta, Georgia. Love is a two-time Grammy Award nominee, making her the first British female hip hop artist to hold that distinction.

Career

Music
Love's debut album, Down to Earth, was released on 6 November 1990. It spawned the singles "Monie in the Middle" (a track dealing with a woman's right to determine what she wants out of a relationship) and "It's a Shame (My Sister)" (which sampled the (Detroit) Spinners' "It's a Shame", written for the band by the US musician Stevie Wonder). It also featured house-music vocalist and then-labelmate Ultra Naté. The album reached No. 26 on the Top R&B/Hip-Hop Albums chart. Love also appears on the song titled "United" from Inner City's third album, Praise, and raps a response verse from the woman's perspective on a 1989 remix of the Fine Young Cannibals hit, "She Drives Me Crazy".

Love was featured on the LA Reid & Babyface remix of Whitney Houston's R&B hit "My Name Is Not Susan" in 1991, and appeared in the music video alongside Houston. Love's 1992 single "Full-Term Love", from the Class Act movie soundtrack, reached No. 7 on the Hot Hip-Hop Singles chart. Love collaborated with Marley Marl on her second album, In a Word or 2 (1993), which featured the Prince-produced single "Born To B.R.E.E.D." (which reached No. 1 on the Hot Dance Music chart and No. 7 on the Hot Rap Singles chart), as well as a re-release of "Full-Term Love". The same year, Prince asked her to write lyrics for a few songs on a side-project, Carmen Electra's eponymous album, Carmen Electra. Love's last release as lead artist was the single "Slice of da Pie" in 2000. In 2013, she was featured on the track "Sometimes" by Ras Kass, from his album Barmageddon, and in 2021, she released a single called “Divine”, featuring Skyzoo and a friend of theirs called Tuff.

US Radio
From 2004 until the week of 11 December 2006, Love was the morning drive host on Philadelphia's WPHI-FM 100.3. The Philadelphia Daily News confirmed on 22 December that Love left WPHI-FM on amicable terms after contract negotiations stalled. Love's departure from WPHI followed soon after her December 2006 interview with Young Jeezy, where the two argued over whether hip hop is dead. Love is also an official MySpace.com DJ, according to her Myspace page. She has a radio show on XM Satellite Radio called Ladies First Radio with Monie Love. It airs Thursdays 6 PM ET and Sundays 8 PM ET. In 2015, Love became a DJ on Philadelphia's Boom 107.9, hosting a morning show from 6 am to 10 am. In 2016, Love co-hosted with Ed Lover on the Ed Lover Morning Show for "Boom 92" KROI in Houston, Texas.  In 2018, Monie Love did the workday and lunch break from 10am-3pm on 106.7 WTLC in Indianapolis, Indiana. In May 2019, she began hosting afternoons at "KISS 104.1" WALR in Atlanta.

Personal life
Born in England from a jazz musician father, Love has two brothers, Richard and David Gooden (known as Dave Angel), and a sister named Rosanna Sharian Gooden (who is a singer known as Baz). Love moved to America, settling in New York City in March 1988. She has four children.  She has been married twice and is a single parent. Her family is African-Jamaican.

Discography

Studio albums

Singles

As lead artist

As featured artist

As featured artist
 "Ladies First" (Queen Latifah featuring Monie Love)
 "My Name Is Not Susan" (Whitney Houston featuring Monie Love) – My Name Is Not Susan (Power Radio Mix With Rap)

References

External links
 [ AllMusic.com Biography – Monie Love]
 Monie Love's myspace.com page
 Monie Love Discography on Discogs
 A site focusing on the early days of Hip Hop development in the UK
 Monie Love Hip-Hop 40th Anniversary
 The Greatest Female Rappers of All Time

1970 births
Living people
English expatriates in the United States
English dance musicians
English radio personalities
English women rappers
Black British women rappers
English people of Jamaican descent
Warner Records artists
Chrysalis Records artists
Rappers from London
Native Tongues Posse
People from Battersea
20th-century British rappers
20th-century English women
20th-century English people
20th-century women rappers